The University of Balamand (UOB) is a private institution, secular in its policies and approach to education. It welcomes faculty, students, and staff from all faiths and national or ethnic origins. The university is located in the northern district of El-Koura, Lebanon. It was founded by the Orthodox Patriarch Ignatius IV of Antioch in 1988. The university's main campus is adjacent to Balamand Monastery, but it has two other campuses in Beirut: One is in Sin el Fil, which houses the majority of the Lebanese Academy of Fine Arts, and the other neighbors Saint George Hospital in Achrafieh, which houses the faculty for medicine and medical sciences. It also has campuses in Akkar and Souk El Gharb.

Formerly conceived as just a project in the Koura District, it fused administratively  with the Lebanese Academy of Fine Arts (ALBA) and St. John of Damascus Institute of Theology to become a full-blown university.

The University of Balamand was founded by the Patriarch through the inspiration of a Kouranian engineer called Elias Abi Chahine of Amioun, in which the concept formed between years 1983 and 1987, in the midst of the Lebanese Civil War. The project started soon after Governmental Clearance in 1988.

As of 2014, the implementation of its Master Plan at the mount of long heritage, Balamand, proceeds steadily.

Name
The name ‘Balamand’ comes from, “Bel monde,” a French description  which was  the first given name for the “beautiful world” the Crusaders discovered after crossing Tripoli city in the twelves century. Such  naming is not unique; for example “Bella” village, one of the most picturesque spots in Becharreh region (named by the Italians) and “Terre belle” an almost 500 meters high volcanic mountain reigning over Tripoli city, are two of hundreds if not thousands of European-origin names given to city and towns names in Lebanon.

Faculties 

The university consists of 12 faculties, and they are as follows:

Lebanese Academy of Fine Arts (French and English)

St. John of Damascus Institute of Theology (Arabic, English and Spanish)

Faculty of Arts and Sciences (Arabic, English and French)

Faculty of Business and Management (English)

School of Tourism and Hotel Management (English)

Faculty of Sciences (English)

Faculty of Engineering (English)

(Chemical Engineering: Prof. Henri EL ZAKHEM was appointed in 2007 to establish the Department of Chemical Engineering at the University of Balamand as its founding chairperson, following a generous donation from the late Maroun Semaan. He held his role as chairperson until 2019. During this period, under his leadership, UOB launched the first Chemical and Petroleum Engineering program in Lebanon. Prof. Zakhem assisted in the Maroun Semaan Building design, which included 10 state-of-the-art academic and research laboratories complementing the educational programs - BS, BE, and MS. In addition, he prepared and presented the accreditation file for the Chemical Engineering program for the University of Balamand in Dubai in 2017, and as a part of the FOE ABET Team, he led the departmental efforts towards ABET accreditation in 2019).

Faculty of Health Sciences (English)

Saint George's Postgraduate Medical Education (English)

Faculty of Medicine & Medical Sciences (English)

Issam M. Fares Institute of Technology (English and French)

Faculty of Library and Information Studies(English)

There are also further expansion plans, including:

 Programs for arts and social sciences, business and management, engineering, health sciences for a new University of Balamand campus in Souk El Gharb.
 A seven-story Balamand hospital in El-Koura (under construction)
 A museum, containing some of the most important historical documents, old pictures, and precious artifacts of the Antiochian Patriarchate Heritage

Buildings under construction 

On the Main Campus: 
 An Engineering complex of presently two buildings: the “Riad Rizk and Khalil Rizk Civil Engineering Building,” now under construction and an Engineering building that will house the Mechanical, Electrical, and Computer engineering departments—both occupying 16,000 square meters
 The Ghassan Rizk Business Executive Center of 1,500 square meters.
 The Balamand Hospital will cover an area of 24,000 square meters and will be located at the hill-bottom of the main campus.

On the Souk El Gharb Campus: 
 One building of 6,500 square meters. *Google Earth map

“In 2014, the University of Balamand and the Dubai Investment Group agreed on terms to open a university in the Dubai Investment Park so as to serve Dubai's growing population with state of the art education. Details of this project are still under study with a master plan slated to be ready by 2015.”

See also 
 Lebanese Academy of Fine Arts
 Saint George Hospital
 El-Koura
 Greek Orthodox Christianity in Lebanon

References

External links 
 
 Cin.org:  University of Balamand

 
Koura District
Universities in Lebanon
1988 establishments in Lebanon
Educational institutions established in 1988